Cheshmeh Bar (also Romanized as Cheshmeh Bār and Chashmeh Bār; also known as Chashmeh Bad) is a village in Dowlatabad Rural District, in the Central District of Abhar County, Zanjan Province, Iran. At the 2006 census, its population was 234, in 58 families.

Language 
All of Cheshmeh Bar's people speak the Azerbaijani Turkish and Abhari dialect.

Job 
The people of this village are farmers and cattle breeders.

Crops 
Grapes, wheat, barley and almonds are the main products of this village.

Some pictures

References 

Populated places in Abhar County